The Skete of St Anne is a dependent idiorrhythmic (hermitage-style) skete, a monastic community attached to the more formalised Great Lavra Monastery in Mount Athos, Greece.

It lies on the shore of the Aegean Sea about 800 metres from the New Skete.

The hamlet of Vouleftiria is located in the lower (western) part of the skete.

History

The kyriakon (central church) of the Skete of Saint Anne was built in 1680 when the skete was being enlarged by Patriarch Dionysius III of Constantinople.

List of cells
List of cells and other buildings in Agia Anna Skete:

Notable people 
 Cyril V of Constantinople
 Nicodemus of Elbasan

Namesakes 
Centaurea sanctae-annae, a species of knapweed, is named after the skete.

Further reading

References

External links

Anne
Greek Orthodox monasteries
Great Lavra